The Reich Security Main Office (RSHA) was an organization under Heinrich Himmler in his dual capacity as Chef der Deutschen Polizei (Chief of German Police) and Reichsführer-SS, the head of the Nazi Party's Schutzstaffel (SS). The organization's stated duty was to fight all "enemies of the Reich" inside and outside the borders of Nazi Germany.

Formation and development 
Himmler established the RSHA on 27 September 1939. His assumption of control over all security and police forces in Germany was a significant factor in the growth in power of the Nazi state. With the formation of the RSHA, Himmler combined under one roof the Nazi Party's Sicherheitsdienst (SD; SS intelligence service) with the Sicherheitspolizei (SiPo; "Security Police"), which was nominally under the Interior Ministry. The SiPo was composed of two sub-departments, the Geheime Staatspolizei (Gestapo; "Secret State Police") and the  Kriminalpolizei (Kripo; "Criminal Police"). In correspondence, the RSHA was often abbreviated to RSi-H to avoid confusion with the SS-Rasse- und Siedlungshauptamt (RuSHA; "SS Race and Settlement Office").

The creation of the RSHA represented the formalization, at the highest level, of the relationship under which the SD served as the intelligence agency for the security police. A similar coordination existed in the local offices, where the Gestapo, criminal police, and SD were formally separate offices. This coordination was carried out by inspectors on the staff of the local higher SS and police leaders. One of the principal functions of the local SD units was to serve as the intelligence agency for the local Gestapo units. In the occupied territories, the formal relationship between local units of the Gestapo, criminal police, and SD was slightly closer.

The RSHA continued to grow at an enormous rate during World War II in Europe. Routine reorganization of the RSHA did not change the tendency for centralization within Nazi Germany, nor did it change the general trend for organizations like the RSHA to develop direct relationships to Adolf Hitler, adhering to Nazi Germany's typical pattern of the leader-follower construct. For the RSHA, centrality within Nazi Germany was pronounced since the organization completed the integration of government and Nazi Party offices as to intelligence gathering and security. Departments like the SD and Gestapo (within the RSHA) were controlled directly by Himmler and his immediate subordinate SS-Obergruppenführer and General of Police Reinhard Heydrich; the two held the power of life and death for nearly every German and were essentially above the law.

Heydrich remained the RSHA chief until his assassination in 1942. In January 1943 Himmler delegated the office to SS-Obergruppenführer and General of Police Ernst Kaltenbrunner, who headed the RSHA until the end of the war in Europe. The head of the RSHA was also known as the CSSD or Chef der Sicherheitspolizei und des SD (Chief of the Security Police and of the Security Service).

Organization
According to British author Gerald Reitlinger, the RSHA "became a typical overblown bureaucracy... The complexity of RSHA was unequalled... with at least a hundred... sub-sub-sections, a modest camouflage of the fact that it handled the progressive extermination which Hitler planned for the ten million Jews of Europe".

Structure
The organization at its simplest was divided into seven offices (Ämter):

 Amt I, "Administration and Legal", originally headed by SS-Gruppenführer Dr. Werner Best. In 1940, he was succeeded by SS-Brigadeführer Bruno Streckenbach. In April 1944, Erich Ehrlinger took over as department chief.
 Amt II, "Ideological Investigation", headed by SS-Brigadeführer Professor Franz Six.
 Amt III, "Spheres of German Life" or the Inland-SD, headed by SS-Gruppenführer Otto Ohlendorf, was the SS information gathering service for inside Germany. It also dealt with ethnic Germans outside of Germany's prewar borders, and matters of culture.
 Amt IV, "Suppression of Opposition". This was the Geheime Staatspolizei, better known by the sobriquet Gestapo. It was headed by SS-Gruppenführer Heinrich Müller. SS-Obersturmbannführer Adolf Eichmann, one of the main architects of the Holocaust, was head of the Amt IV sub-department called Referat IV B4.
 Amt V, "Suppression of Crime" Kriminalpolizei (Kripo), originally led by SS-Gruppenführer Arthur Nebe and later by SS-Oberführer Friedrich Panzinger. This was the Criminal Police, which dealt with serious non-political crimes, such as rape, murder, and arson. Amt V was also known as the Reichskriminalpolizeiamt (Reich Criminal Police Department or RKPA).
 Amt VI, "Foreign Intelligence Service" or Ausland-SD, originally led by SS-Brigadeführer Heinz Jost and later by SS-Brigadeführer Walter Schellenberg.
 Amt VII, "Ideological Research and Evaluation"  was a reconstitution of Amt II overseen by SS-Brigadeführer Professor Dr. Franz Six. Later it was headed by SS-Obersturmbannführer Paul Dittel. It was responsible for the creation of anti-semitic, anti-masonic propaganda, the sounding of public opinion, and monitoring of Nazi indoctrination by the public.

Leadership

Role in the Holocaust
RSHA-controlled activities included gathering intelligence, criminal investigation, overseeing foreigners, monitoring public opinion, and Nazi indoctrination. The RSHA was also "the central office for the extra-judicial NS (National Socialist) measures of terror and repression from the beginning of the war until 1945".  The list of persecuted people included Jews, Communists, Freemasons, pacifists, and Christian activists. In addition to dealing with identified enemies, the RSHA advocated expansionist policies for the Reich and the Germanization of additional territory through settlement. Generalplan Ost (General Plan East), which was the secret Nazi plan to colonize Central and Eastern Europe exclusively with Germans, displacing inhabitants in the process through genocide and ethnic cleansing in order to obtain sufficient Lebensraum, stemmed from officials in the RSHA, among other Nazi organizations.

In its role as the national and Nazi security service, the RSHA coordinated activities among various agencies with wide-ranging responsibilities within the Reich. According to German historian, Klaus Hildebrand, the RSHA was "particularly concerned with racial matters". Adolf Eichmann stated in 1937 that "the anger of the people expressed in riots [was] the most effective means to rob the Jews of a sense of security". Entry into the Second World War afforded the RSHA the power to act as an intermediary in conquered or occupied territories, which according to Hans Mommsen, lent itself to implementing the extermination of Jewish populations in those places. An order issued by the RSHA on 20 May 1941 to block emigration of any and all Jews attempting to leave Belgium or France as part of the "imminent Final Solution of the Jewish question" demonstrates its complicity for the systematic extermination of Jews. Part of the RSHA's efforts to encourage occupied nations to hand over their Jews included coercing them by assigning Jewish advisory officials. Working with Eichmann's Reich Association of Jews in Germany, they also deliberately deceived Jews still living in Germany and other countries by promising them good living quarters, medical care, and food in Theresienstadt (a concentration camp which was a way station to extermination facilities like Auschwitz) if they turned over their assets to the RSHA through a fictitious home-purchase plan.

Oversight of Einsatzgruppen
The RSHA oversaw the Einsatzgruppen, death squads that were formed under the direction of Heydrich and operated by the SS. Originally part of the SiPo, in September 1939 the operational control of the Einsatzgruppen was taken over by the RSHA. When the units were re-formed prior to the invasion of the Soviet Union in 1941, the men of the Einsatzgruppen were recruited from the SD, Gestapo, Kripo, Orpo, and Waffen-SS. The units followed the invasion forces of the German Army into Eastern Europe. Not infrequently, commanders of Einsatzgruppen and Einsatzkommando sub-units were also desk officers from the main office of the RSHA. Historian Raul Hilberg estimates that between 1941 and 1945 the Einsatzgruppen, related agencies, and foreign auxiliary troops co-opted by the Nazis, killed more than two million people, including 1.3 million Jews.

Rosenstrasse protest and RSHA involvement

As early as 1941, Propaganda Minister Joseph Goebbels began to complain that large numbers of Jews had not been transported out of Germany because of their work in the armaments industry. They were protected from deportation as they were considered to be irreplaceable labourers, and many were also married to Aryan Germans. These Jews believed that these factors ensured their safety. But by late 1942, Hitler and the RSHA were ready to rid Berlin of its remaining German Jews. In September 1942, Hitler decided that these labourers would still be protected, but that they were to be sent out of the country. Meanwhile, Auschwitz administrators were lobbying the government to send them more armaments workers, as they had struck a bargain with the arms producer IG Farben to construct a camp specifically for arms development using slave labour. As a result, the RSHA decreed the Fabrik-Aktion, an initiative to register all Jews working in armaments production. The primary targets of this action were Jews who were married to Aryans.

The RSHA planned to remove all German Jews from Berlin in early 1943 (the deadline to deport these Jews was 28 February 1943, according to a diary entry Goebbels wrote in early February). On 27 February 1943, the RSHA sent plainclothes Gestapo officials to arrest intermarried Jews and charge them with various crimes. Around 2,000 intermarried Jewish men were taken to Rosenstrasse 2–4, where they were held. Goebbels complained that many of the arrests had been "thwarted" by industrialists since some 4,000 Jews were expected to be detained. Angry wives—as "Women of German blood"–began protesting against this action in front of the building on Rosenstrasse where the men were being held. On 6 March, all but 25 of the intermarried Jews were released; the 25 still held were sent to Auschwitz. On 8 March, RSHA head Ernst Kaltenbrunner told Interior Minister Wilhelm Frick that the deportations had been limited to Jews who were not intermarried.

See also
 Glossary of Nazi Germany
 List of SS personnel
 OVRA – Fascist Italy's secret police, similar to the Gestapo
 SS-Wirtschafts-Verwaltungshauptamt (WVHA, the economic & administrative department of the SS)
 Red Orchestra – RSHA operations against a wartime Soviet espionage ring.

References
Informational notes

Citations

Bibliography

 
 
 
 
 
 
 
 
 
 
 
 
 
 
 
 
 
 
 
 
 
 
  
 
 

Online
 
 
 

Further reading
 Evans, Richard J. The Coming of the Third Reich. New York: Penguin, 2005.
 Evans, Richard J. The Third Reich in Power. New York: Penguin, 2006.
 Evans, Richard J. The Third Reich at War. New York: Penguin, 2009 [2008].
  Vol. 1 and Vol. 2.
 Wildt, Michael (2002). Generation of the Unbound: The Leadership Corps of the Reich Security Main Office, Jerusalem: Yad Vashem. .
 Wildt, Michael (2010). An Uncompromising Generation: The Nazi Leadership of the Reich Security Main Office. Madison, WI: University of Wisconsin Press.
 
 

 
Government of Nazi Germany
Police forces of Nazi Germany
Allgemeine SS
Reinhard Heydrich